In number theory, the local zeta function  (sometimes called the congruent zeta function or the Hasse–Weil zeta function) is defined as

Making the variable transformation  gives

as the formal power series in the variable .

Equivalently, the local zeta function is sometimes defined as follows: 

In other words, the local zeta function  with coefficients in the finite field  is defined as a function whose logarithmic derivative generates the number  of solutions of the equation defining  in the degree  extension

Formulation

Given a finite field F, there is, up to isomorphism, only one field Fk with

,

for k = 1, 2, ... . Given a set of polynomial equations — or an algebraic variety V — defined over F, we can count the number

of solutions in Fk and create the generating function

.

The correct definition for Z(t) is to set log Z equal to G,  so

and Z(0) = 1, since G(0) = 0, and Z(t) is a priori a formal power series.

The logarithmic derivative

equals the generating function

.

Examples

For example, assume all the Nk are 1; this happens for example if we start with an equation like X = 0, so that geometrically we are taking V to be a point. Then

is the expansion of a logarithm (for |t| < 1). In this case we have

To take something more interesting, let V be the projective line over F. If F has q elements, then this has q + 1 points, including the one point at infinity. Therefore, we have

and

for |t| small enough, and therefore

The first study of these functions was in the 1923 dissertation of Emil Artin. He obtained results for the case of a hyperelliptic curve, and conjectured the further main points of the theory as applied to curves. The theory was then developed by F. K. Schmidt and Helmut Hasse. The earliest known nontrivial cases of local zeta functions were implicit in Carl Friedrich Gauss's Disquisitiones Arithmeticae, article 358. There, certain particular examples of elliptic curves over finite fields having complex multiplication have their points counted by means of cyclotomy.

For the definition and some examples, see also.

Motivations

The relationship between the definitions of G and Z can be explained in a number of ways. (See for example the infinite product formula for Z below.) In practice it makes Z a rational function of t, something that is interesting even in the case of V an elliptic curve over  finite field.

The local Z zeta functions are multiplied to get global  zeta functions,

These generally involve different finite fields (for example the whole family of fields Z/pZ as p runs over all prime numbers).

In these fields,  the variable t is substituted by p−s, where s is the complex variable traditionally used in Dirichlet series. (For details see Hasse–Weil zeta function.)

Riemann hypothesis for curves over finite fields

For projective curves C over F that are non-singular, it can be shown that

with P(t) a polynomial, of degree 2g, where g is the genus of C. Rewriting

the Riemann hypothesis for curves over finite fields states

For example, for the elliptic curve case there are two roots, and it is easy to show the absolute values of the roots are q1/2. Hasse's theorem is that they have the same absolute value; and this has immediate consequences for the number of points.

André Weil proved this for the general case, around 1940 (Comptes Rendus note, April 1940): he spent much time in the years after that writing up the algebraic geometry involved. This led him to the general Weil conjectures. Alexander Grothendieck developed scheme theory for the purpose of resolving these.
A generation later Pierre Deligne completed the proof. 
(See étale cohomology for the basic formulae of the general theory.)

General formulas for the zeta function

It is a consequence of the Lefschetz trace formula for the Frobenius morphism that

Here, the product ranges over all closed points x of X and deg(x) is the degree of x.
The local zeta function Z(X, t) is viewed as a function of the complex variable s via the change of 
variables q−s.

In the case where X is the variety V discussed above, the closed points 
generated by the coordinates of P.  The logarithmic derivative of the infinite product Z(X, t) is easily seen to be the generating function discussed above, namely

.

See also
List of zeta functions
Weil conjectures
Elliptic curve

References

Algebraic varieties
Finite fields
Diophantine geometry
Zeta and L-functions
Fixed points (mathematics)
Bernhard Riemann